Kirsten Thorup is a Danish author.

Background and education 
Kirsten Thorup was born in Gelsted, Funen, Denmark in 1942. After a brief stay in Cambridge as an au pair, she studied English at the University of Copenhagen. She quit university already after a year.

Literary works 
She is the author of three poetry collections, a volume of short stories, and three novels including Baby which has been translated into English. She has also written for films, television, and radio. Her novel, Den lange sommer, was published in Denmark in 1979.

Kirsten Thorup now lives in Copenhagen.

Bibliography 
 I dagens anledning (short stories) – 1968
 Baby (novel) – 1973
 Lille Jonna (novel) – 1977
 Den lange sommer (novel) – 1979
 Himmel og helvede (novel) – 1982
 Den yderste grænse (novel) – 1987
 Elskede ukendte (novel) – 1994
 Bonsai (novel) – 2000
 Ingenmandsland (novel) – 2003
 Erindring om kærligheden (lit: Memory of love) (novel)
 Indtil vanvid, indtil døden (novel) – 2020

Recognition 
 1974 – Otto Gelsted Prize
 1996 – Tagea Brandts Rejselegat
 2000 – Grand Prize of the Danish Academy
 2017 – Nordic Council Literature Prize

References

1942 births
Living people
20th-century Danish novelists
Recipients of the Grand Prize of the Danish Academy
Danish women novelists
20th-century Danish poets
Danish women poets
20th-century Danish short story writers
Danish women short story writers
20th-century Danish women writers
People from Middelfart Municipality